Carenum marginatum is a species of ground beetle in the subfamily Scaritinae. It was described by Jean Baptiste Boisduval in 1835.

References

marginatum
Beetles described in 1835